The 2017 Anambra State gubernatorial election occurred in Nigeria on 18 November 2017, the APGA nominee Willie Obiano won re-election, defeating Tony Nwoye of the APC.

Willie Obiano won APGA gubernatorial candidate after emerging the sole candidate. He picked Nkem Okeke as his running mate. Tony Nwoye was the APC candidate with Dozie Ikedife as his running mate. 37 candidates contested in the election.

Electoral system
The Governor of Anambra State is elected using the plurality voting system.

Primary election

APGA primary
The APGA primary election was held on 15 August 2017. Willie Obiano emerged the sole candidate after scoring 1,070 to a 'yes' and 'no' votes.

APC primary
The APC primary election was held on 26 August 2017. Tony Nwoye won the primary election after defeating  11 other candidates. His closet rival was Andy Uba who had 931 votes.

Results
A total number of 37 candidates registered with the Independent National Electoral Commission to contest in the election.

The total number of registered voters in the state were 88,793, accredited voters 457,311, total number of votes cast was 448,771, while number of valid votes were 422,314. 6,457 votes were rejected.

By local government area
Here are the results of the election by local government area for the two major parties. The total valid votes of 422,314 represents the 37 political parties that participated in the election. Green represents LGAs won by Willie Obiano. Blue represents LGAs won by Tony Nwoye.

References 

Anambra State gubernatorial election
Anambra State gubernatorial election
2017